The Subcommittee on Economic Growth, Energy Policy and Regulatory Affairs is a subcommittee within the United States House Committee on Oversight and Government Reform. It was previously known as the Subcommittee on Economic and Consumer Policy.

Jurisdiction
[The subcommittee] shall have oversight jurisdiction over: income inequality and policies that affect the growth and prosperity of the middle class, including education, housing, labor, trade, small business, agriculture; securities regulation; consumer protection; private sector information technology security, policy, and management; intellectual property; telecommunications; and federal acquisition policy unrelated to national security and information technology

Members, 117th Congress

Historical subcommittee rosters

116th Congress

References

External links
Subcommittee Homepage

Oversight Economic
Government procurement in the United States